Gesta is a genus of skippers in the family Hesperiidae.

Species
Recognised species in the genus Gesta include:
 Gesta gesta (Herrich Schäffer, 1863)

References

Natural History Museum Lepidoptera genus database

Erynnini
Hesperiidae genera